The 2023 Loyola Ramblers men's volleyball team represents Loyola University Chicago in the 2023 NCAA Division I & II men's volleyball season. The Ramblers, led by first year head coach John Hawks, play their home games at Joseph J. Gentile Arena. The Ramblers are members of the Midwestern Intercollegiate Volleyball Association and were picked to finish second in the MIVA in the preseason poll.

Roster

Schedule

 *-Indicates conference match.
 Times listed are Central Time Zone.

Broadcasters
Missouri S&T: Scott Sudikoff & Ray Gooden
King: Scott Sudikoff & Ray Gooden
UC San Diego: Ray Gooden & Henry Payne 
NJIT: Ira Thor 
LIU: 
Maryville: 
St. Francis Brooklyn: 
Concordia Irvine: 
Long Beach State: 
Quincy: 
Lindenwood: 
Ball State: 
Ohio State: 
Lewis: 
McKendree: 
Purdue Fort Wayne:
Queens: 
McKendree: 
Charleston: 
Purdue Fort Wayne: 
Lewis: 
George Mason: 
Lindenwood: 
Quincy: 
Ball State: 
Ohio State:

Rankings 

^The Media did not release a Pre-season or Week 1 poll.

Honors
To be filled in upon completion of the season.

References

2023 in sports in Illinois
2023 NCAA Division I & II men's volleyball season
2023 team
Loyola Chicago
Volleyball in Illinois